Hubert Ferrer (born 26 January 1937) is a French former professional racing cyclist. He rode in four editions of the Tour de France.

References

External links
 

1937 births
Living people
French male cyclists
Sportspeople from Algiers
Pieds-Noirs